Lucire  is a fashion magazine that originally began on the web in 1997, before adding a monthly print edition in its home country of New Zealand in 2004, and is now published seasonally, with a monthly for licensees. It is the first fashion partner with the UNEP, an arrangement that began in 2003. In 1999, Harper's Bazaar Australia listed Lucire in its "A-list of Style" supplement. In 2018, Lucire was listed by StyleCaster as one of the "21 International Fashion Magazines That Should Be on Your Radar." In 2022, LUXlife named Lucire its "Most Pioneering Online Fashion Magazine."

History
At its launch, it was the second online fashion title in New Zealand (after Wellington Polytechnic's Fashionbrat), and the first commercial fashion magazine on the web there. With Fashionbrat lasting only one issue, Lucire is the longest running online fashion magazine in New Zealand. It claims to be the first fashion title to extend its brand from the internet into print, and the first website to launch print editions in more than one country.

Summer Rayne Oakes was made the US Editor in 2007 and subsequently editor-at-large. Stanley Moss serves as travel editor and Elyse Glickman its US west coast editor. Sopheak Seng became its fashion editor in 2010. Qurratulain Wahab edits Lucire KSA in Saudi Arabia. Lucire was founded by Jack Yan, who continues to serve as publisher.

When conceived, the name was not intended to have a meaning; it was only later that the team discovered it was a quaint Romanian term meaning ‘to glitter’.

In the early 2000s, Lucire covered new talent alongside more established names. It was one of the first publications to profile actress Gal Gadot, designer Zac Posen, MTV New Zealand presenter and former beauty queen Amber Peebles, and numerous others. In 2003, it was the second-ever New Zealand website to be nominated for a Webby Award.

Print edition cover girls have included Gal Gadot, Laura Vandervoort, Violett Beane, Denise Richards, Javicia Leslie, Camille Hyde, Brittny Gastineau, Vanessa Carlton, Sarah McLachlan, Stacie Jones Upchurch, Nicky Hilton and Theodora Richards.

International editions

Lucire launched its first international edition in Romania (helmed by Mirella and Valentin Lapusca) in May 2005, claiming to be the first New Zealand fashion magazine to enter the continent, and the first webzine in the world to launch two print editions. A Thai edition, Twinpalms Lucire, launched in 2008 in conjunction with Twinpalms Resort. Additionally, Vox magazine in Qatar was briefly launched in conjunction with Lucire, while a one-off Bahraini edition appeared in 2014. In 2018 Lucire KSA was launched in Saudi Arabia, as a monthly English-language magazine. Lucire KSA is now supplied in the first and business classes of the national carrier Saudia, and in their airport lounges. Lucire Rouge, a US edition, appeared in 2020, extending the magazine's coverage into wellness. A French-language edition of Lucire KSA appeared in 2021.

Notes

External links

Lifestyle magazines
Magazines established in 1997
Women's magazines published in New Zealand
Women's magazines published in Romania
Women's fashion magazines
Monthly magazines published in New Zealand
Mass media in Wellington